RGE may refer to

Racing Green Endurance
Runaway greenhouse effect
Rochester Gas and Electric
Roubini Global Economics
Royal Golden Eagle
Rádio Gravações Especializadas
Renormalization group equation
Beta-function
Callan–Symanzik equation
Exact renormalization group equation
Rogue (esports)